Ryan McGeever (born 30 April 1994) is a Scottish footballer who plays Clyde on loan for Dumbarton where he is club captain. McGeever began his career with Queen's Park, and signed for Falkirk in the summer of 2012 also spending time with Brechin City. During his time at Falkirk, he had loan spells at Peterhead and Arbroath (twice).

Club career

Falkirk
McGeever joined Falkirk in the summer of 2012, making his first team début in the Scottish Football League First Division against Dumbarton on 20 October 2012. On his second start for the club, McGeever earned the ire of Partick Thistle boss Jackie McNamara for a "shocking" challenge on Thistle's Stuart Bannigan.

In January 2013, McGeever signed a new three-and-a-half year contract with Falkirk, tying him to the club until 2016.

Peterhead (loan)
McGeever joined Scottish League Two side Peterhead on a season-long loan on 22 August 2013. His Peterhead debut came two days later, in the 2–2 draw against Elgin City. McGeever made nine appearances in all competitions for the club.

Arbroath (loans)
On 31 March 2014, McGeever signed for Scottish League One club Arbroath on loan until the end of the 2013–14 season.

On 8 January 2015, McGeever returned to Arbroath for a second loan spell.

Queen's Park
On 7 August 2015, McGeever signed for Queen's Park, returning to the club three years after first leaving.

Brechin City
After impressing in his performances for Queen's Park during the 2016–17 season, McGeever subsequently signed for recently promoted Scottish Championship club Brechin City on 12 June 2017.

Dumbarton
McGeever joined Scottish League One side Dumbarton in July 2019 where he became an ever-present for the Sons, scoring five times in 33 games. He extended his deal with the club until the summer of 2021 in July 2020. After another impressive season at the Rock, he turned down offers from elsewhere to sign a new two-year deal with the Sons in May 2021 – despite the club not having a manager in place at the time. He was named the Sons' captain in June 2022 - replacing Stuart Carswell in the role.

Clyde (loan) 
After struggling for gametime as he recovered from a long-term injury, McGeever moved to Scottish League One side Clyde on loan in February 2023 - with Peter Grant going in the opposite direction.

Career statistics

References

External links

1994 births
Living people
Scottish Football League players
Scottish Professional Football League players
Falkirk F.C. players
Footballers from Glasgow
Queen's Park F.C. players
Peterhead F.C. players
Arbroath F.C. players
Brechin City F.C. players
Scottish footballers
Association football defenders
Dumbarton F.C. players
Clyde F.C. players